Gossner may refer to:

People
 Ernst Gossner (born 1967), Austrian film director, screenwriter and producer
 Johannes Gossner (1773–1858), German clergyman and philanthropist
 Miriam Gössner (born 1990), German biathlete and cross-country skier
 Simone Daro Gossner (1920–2002), Belgian-American astronomer

Education
 Gossner Theological College, a Christian Theological Seminary in Jharkhand, India
 Gossner College, a Christian college in Assam, India

Other
 Gossner Foods, one of the largest cheese manufacturers in the United States, based in Logan, Utah